The 1991 GTE U.S. Men's Hard Court Championships was a men's tennis tournament played on outdoor hard courts at the Indianapolis Tennis Center in Indianapolis, Indiana in the United States that was part of the Championship Series of the 1991 ATP Tour. It was the fourth edition of the tournament and was held from August 12 through August 18, 1991. Fifth-seeded Pete Sampras won the singles title and earned $137,500 first-prize money.

Finals

Singles

 Pete Sampras defeated  Boris Becker 7–6(7–2), 3–6, 6–3
 It was Sampras' 2nd singles title of the year and the 6th of his career.

Doubles

 Ken Flach /  Robert Seguso defeated  Kent Kinnear /  Sven Salumaa 7–6, 6–4
 It was Flach's 3rd doubles title of the year and the 29th of his career. It was Seguso's 3rd doubles title of the year and the 29th of his career.

References

External links
 ITF tournament edition details

GTE U.S. Men's Hard Court Championships
Atlanta Open (tennis)
Tennis tournaments in Indiana
GTE U.S. Men's Hard Court Championships
GTE U.S. Men's Hard Court Championships
GTE U.S. Men's Hard Court Championships